The Chick Corea Songbook is the twenty-second studio album released by The Manhattan Transfer on September 29, 2009. The album features The Manhattan Transfer's interpretations of several Chick Corea compositions, including a song written by Corea for this album. The executive producer was Yusuf Gandhi.  It was the final album with Tim Hauser, who died in between the release of this album and their subsequent album.

Reviews

All About Jazz editor Jerry D'Souza stated regarding this album, "Manhattan Transfer is back, and in top-notch form with a marvelous blend of melody and song." Regarding individual songs, he added, "Spain" is magical. The snap and crackle are done to a nicety, the arrangement opening the door to gently cascading harmonies and embracing solo singing," "The Story of Anna & Armando (Armando's Rhumba)" is flamboyant, the vocals swaying and resounding in harmony within the balmy atmosphere of the lyrics".

Track listing

Personnel 

The Manhattan Transfer
 Cheryl Bentyne – vocals 
 Tim Hauser – vocals
 Alan Paul – vocals, synthesizers 
 Janis Siegel – vocals, arrangements

Additional personnel
 Chick Corea – keyboards, Yamaha Motif XS8, arrangements
 Yaron Gershovsky – keyboards, Fender Rhodes, acoustic piano, programming, arrangements, backing vocals
 Edsel Gomez – acoustic piano, arrangements
 Bais Haus – synthesizers, drum programming 
 Fred Hersch – acoustic piano, arrangements
 Scott Kinsey – keyboards, arrangements
 Ramón Stagnaro – acoustic guitar 
 Christian McBride – acoustic bass
 John Benitez – double bass, backing vocals 
 Jimmy Earl – bass guitar
 John Herbert – acoustic bass
 Gary Wicks – acoustic bass, bass guitar
 Vince Cherico – drums
 Billy Drummond – drums
 Steve Hass – drums
 Gary Novak – drums
 Alex Acuña – percussion
 Airto Moreira – percussion
 Luis Quintero – percussion
 Joe Passaro – marimba
 Ronnie Cuber – baritone saxophone 
 Steve Tavaglione – sopranino saxophone
 Lou Marini – flute, alto flute
 Don Shelton – whistle
 Conrad Herwig – trombone
 Mike Panella – trumpet
 Robert Rodriguez – trumpet
 Corey Allen – arrangements
 Michele Weir – arrangements

Production 
 The Manhattan Transfer – producers
 Yusuf Gandhi – executive producer, album concept 
 Bill Airey Smith – engineer, mixing 
 Scott Noll – engineer, mixing
 Mark Wilder – mastering 
 Brian Bacchus – album coordinator
 Burton Yount – art direction, design

References

External links
 The Manhattan Transfer Official Website

The Manhattan Transfer albums
2009 albums